Angola participated in the 2010 Summer Youth Olympics in Singapore.

The Angolan team consisted of 21 athletes competing in 5 sports: athletics, basketball, canoeing, handball and swimming.

Athletics

Note: The athletes who do not have a "Q" next to their Qualification Rank advance to a non-medal ranking final.

Boys
Track and Road Events

Basketball

Girls

Canoeing

Boys

Handball

Swimming

References

External links
Competitors List: Angola

Nations at the 2010 Summer Youth Olympics
2010 in Angolan sport
Angola at the Youth Olympics